Kingman may refer to one of the following:

Places 
 Kingman Reef in the northern Pacific Ocean, United States
In the United States:
 Kingman, Arizona
 Kingman, Indiana
 Kingman, Kansas
 Kingman, Maine
 Kingman, Ohio
 Kingman County, Kansas
 Kingman Museum, natural history museum and planetarium in Battle Creek, Michigan
 Kingman Place Historic District, listed on the National Register of Historic Places in Polk County, Iowa
 Kingman Township, Renville County, Minnesota
 Kingman Hall, a house in the Berkeley Student Cooperative in Berkeley, California

People 
 Kingman Brewster Jr., a former President of Yale University and diplomat
 Brian Kingman, a former Major League Baseball pitcher
 Dave Kingman, a former Major League Baseball player
 Dong Kingman, an American artist
 Eduardo Kingman, an Ecuadorian artist
 John Kingman, a British mathematician
 Samuel Austin Kingman (1818–1904), Justice of the Kansas Supreme Court

Sports 
 Kingman (horse), winner of the 1891 Kentucky Derby
Kingman (British horse), winner of the 2014 Irish 2000 Guineas

Transportation
Kingman station, a train station in Arizona

See also
 King's Men (disambiguation)
 Kingsman (disambiguation)
 Kingman's formula